The imperfect (abbreviated ) is a verb form that combines past tense (reference to a past time) and imperfective aspect (reference to a continuing or repeated event or state). It can have meanings similar to the English "was walking" or "used to walk". It contrasts with preterite forms, which refer to a single completed event in the past.

Traditionally, the imperfect of languages such as Latin and French is referred to as one of the tenses, although it actually encodes aspectual information in addition to tense (time reference). It may be more precisely called past imperfective.

English has no general imperfective and expresses it in different ways. The term "imperfect" in English refers to forms much more commonly called past progressive or past continuous (e.g. "was doing" or "were doing"). These are combinations of past tense with specifically continuous or progressive aspect.

"Imperfect" comes from the Latin  "unfinished", because the imperfect expresses an ongoing, uncompleted action. The equivalent Ancient Greek term was  "prolonged".

Indo-European languages

English
Imperfect meanings in English are expressed in different ways depending on whether the event is continuous or habitual.

For a continuous action (one that was in progress at a particular time in the past), the past progressive (past continuous) form is used, as in "I was eating"; "They were running fast." However certain verbs that express state rather than action do not mark the progressive aspect (see ); in these cases the simple past tense is used instead: "He was hungry"; "We knew what to do next."

Habitual (repeated) action in the past can be marked by used to, as in "I used to eat a lot", or by the auxiliary verb would, as in "Back then, I would eat early and would walk to school." (The auxiliary would also has other uses, such as expressing conditional mood.) However, in many cases the habitual nature of the action does not need to be explicitly marked on the verb, and the simple past is used: "We always ate dinner at six o'clock."

Italic languages

Latin
Conjugation of the imperfect indicative:

Notes:
 The imperfect is signified by the signs ba and ebā.
 The imperfect forms of esse are used as auxiliary verbs in the pluperfect of the passive voice along with perfect passive participles.

Romance languages 
In Romance languages, the imperfect is generally a past tense. Its uses include representing:
 Repetition and continuity: an action that was happening, used to happen, or happened regularly in the past, as it was ongoing
 A description of people, things, or conditions of the past
 A time in the past
 A relation between past happenings: a situation that was in progress in the past or a condition originated in a previous time, when another isolated and important event occurred (the first verb, indicating the status in progress or condition from the past using the imperfect, while the latter uses the preterite).
 A physical or mental state or condition in progress in the past.  Often used with verbs of being, emotion, capability, or conscience. 
A common mistake of beginners learning a Romance language is putting too much emphasis on whether the time the action occurred is known. This generally does not affect how the imperfect is used.  For example, the sentence "Someone ate all of my cookies." (when translated) is not a good candidate for the imperfect. Fundamentally, it is no different from the sentence "We ate all the cookies." Note this fails the repeatability requirement of the imperfect, as it is only known to have happened once. On the other hand, the sentence "I used to have fun in the 1960s." is a good candidate for the imperfect, even though its period is known.  In short, knowing when an action occurred is not nearly as important as how long it occurred (or was and still is occurring).

French 
To form the imperfect for French regular verbs, take the first person plural present tense, the "nous" (we) form, subtract the -ons suffix, and add the appropriate ending (the forms for être (to be), whose "nous" form does not end in -ons, are irregular; they start with ét- but have the same endings). Verbs that terminate in a stem of -cer and -ger undergo minor orthographic changes to preserve the phonetic sound or allophone. Verbs whose root terminates in the letter "i" maintain the letter despite the consecutiveness in the "nous" and "vous" forms.

It is used to express the ideas of habitual actions or states of being; physical and emotional descriptions: time, weather, age, feelings; actions or states of an unspecified duration;  background information in conjunction with the passé composé; wishes or suggestions; conditions in "si" clauses; the expressions "être en train de" and "venir de" in the past.

Italian
Conjugation of the imperfect indicative:

Notes:
 Dropping the -re suffix and adding -vo, -vi, -va, -vamo, -vate, and -vano form verbs.
Although dire and opporre (as all the composite forms of verb porre and dire) may seem irregular, they are a part of a verb family that has stronger roots to Latin equivalents (lat. pōnere/pōnēbam and dīcere/dīcēbam). Other verbs include fare(infinitive)/faccio(present tense)/facevo(imperfect) (lat.facere/facio/faciēbam), bere/bevo/bevevo (bibere/bibo/bibēbam), trarre/traggo/traevo (trahere/traho/trahēbam), durre/duco/ducevo[obs.] (dūcere/dūco/dūcēbam) and all their composite forms..
 There is another imperfect in Italian formed by combining the imperfect of the verb stare (stavo, stavi, stava, stavamo, stavate, stavano) with the gerund. For example, "parlavo" could be said as "stavo parlando". The difference is similar to the difference between "I eat" and "I am eating" in English. However, English does not make this distinction in the imperfect.

Romanian
Conjugation of the imperfect indicative:

Notes:
 The imperfect is formed from the short infinitive form of the verbs (without the -re suffix) combined with the -am, -ai, -a, -am, -ați, and -au endings.
 Short infinitives ending in „-a” (1st conjugation) don't double this letter: e.g. "pleca” in the first person singular is "plecam" and not "plecaam").
 Short infinitives ending in "-i" take the pattern of those ending in "-e" (e.g. dormi becomes dormeam in 1st person imperfect), while short infinitives ending in "-î" take the pattern of those ending in "-a" (e.g. hotărî becomes hotăram in 1st person imperfect).
 There is only one irregular verb in the imperfect: a fi, that is created from the radical era-, instead of fi-.

Spanish
In Spanish, the imperfect can be called the imperfecto or the copretérito. Conjugation of the imperfect indicative:

 There are only three irregular verbs in the imperfect: ir, ser, and ver. Historically, ir — unlike other Spanish "-ir verbs" — failed to drop the -b- of the Latin imperfect.  The imperfect of ser is likewise a continuation of the Latin imperfect (of esse), with the same stem appearing in tú eres (thanks to pre-classical Latin rhotacism). The imperfect of ver (veía etc.) was historically considered regular in Old Spanish, where the infinitive veer provided the stem ve-, but that is no longer the case in standard Spanish. In formal language, pronouns "tú" and "vosotros" are replaced by "usted" and "ustedes" (sometimes abbreviated as Ud./Vd. and Uds./Vds.), with the verb conjugated in third person. American Spanish always replaces "vosotros" with "ustedes", switching the verb accordingly. The countries that show the kind of voseo in which "tú" is replaced by "vos" use the same forms as for "tú" in this tense.
 The first person singular and third person singular forms are the same for all verbs; thus, in cases of ambiguity where context is insufficient, a pronoun or subject noun is included for the sake of clarification.

Portuguese
In Portuguese, the imperfect indicative, called "pretérito imperfeito", is quite similar to Spanish: 

There are four irregular verbs: "pôr" (to put), "ser" (to be), "ter" (to have) and "vir" (to come). Unlike in Spanish, the verbs "ver" (to see) and "ir" (to go) are regular in the Portuguese imperfect.

Like in Italian, it is also commonly formed by combining the imperfect of the verb estar (estava, estavas, estava, estávamos, estáveis, estavam) with the gerund (for example, "falando", the gerund form of "falar", to speak, to talk). In Brazilian Portuguese, both in informal oral speech and informal written language (for example, online or phone texting), it is more common to use the composite "estava falando" (commonly reduced to "tava falando"), than to use the synthetic "falava", which is more common in formal written forms.

Both in European and Brazilian Portuguese, the synthetic pluperfect ("eu falara" "I had spoken") is considered old-fashioned and never used in spoken communication – it is substituted by the composite "eu tinha falado", which is formed with the imperfect form of the verb "ter" (to have) (tinha tinhas tinha tínhamos tínheis tinham) plus the past participle ("falado"). Alternatively, the verb "ter" can be swapped with the imperfect form of the verb "haver" (to have) (havia havias havia haviamos havíeis haviam)

Galician

Similar to the closely related Portuguese, as well as to Spanish, but often called "copretérito" (from co-, same particle found in English "collaboration" and "coexistence", plus "pretérito", which is "past tense", in reference of it being a second past tense that exists along the regular one). Same as with them, in formal usage "ti" and "vós/vosoutros" change to "vostede" and "vostedes" and are followed by the third person. In verbs ended in -aer, -oer, -aír and -oír, the first and second person of the plural show the presence of a diaeresis.

Indo-Aryan languages

Hindi 
Hindi, an Indo-Aryan language, has indicative imperfect tense conjugation only for the verb होना (honā) [to be] and the rest of the verbs lack this conjugation. The indicative imperfect forms of होना (honā) comes from Sanskrit स्थित (stʰita) "standing, situated" which are derived from the PIE root *steh₂- (“to stand”). The imperfect conjugation is derived from a participle form and hence its conjugations agree only with the number and gender of the grammatical person and not the pronoun itself. So, the grammatically singular pronouns (e.g., मैं ma͠i "I" and तू tū "you" etc.) are assigned the singular imperfect forms (i.e. था thā or थी thī) depending on the gender of the person or the noun they refer to, and the grammatically plural pronouns (e.g. हम ham "we" etc.) are assigned the plural imperfect forms (थे thē and थीं thīm̊). An exception to this is the pronoun तुम (tum) which takes in the plural imperfect form (थे thē) in masculine gender but singular form (थी thī) in feminine gender.

These imperfect conjugations also act as copula to form the imperfect past forms for the three grammatical aspects that Hindi hasː Habitual, Perfective, and Progressive aspects.

Assamese 
In Assamese, two imperfect forms are recognisedː present progressive and/or present perfect & past progressive and/or remote past. There is only one periphrastic tense which functions as both the present progressive and present perfect with reference to the setting in which is placed.

Indo-Iranian languages

Persian
Like all other past tenses, imperfect is conjugated regularly for all verbs. Formation: [preverb] + mi- + past stem + past ending. Conjugation of the imperfect indicative for the first person singular is shown in the table belowː

Slavic languages
Most Slavic languages have lost the imperfect but it is preserved in Bulgarian and Macedonian. It is also officially retained in Serbian and Croatian but is considered old-fashioned and restricted to literature for poetic and stylistic reasons.

Turkish
Turkish has separate tenses for past continuous and imperfect.
To form the past continuous tense for Turkish verbs, after removing the infinitive suffix (-mek or -mak), take the present continuous tense suffix "-yor" without personal suffixes, and add the ending for the simple past plus the appropriate personal suffix
 As -du (which has a rounded back vowel) succeeds -lar (which has an unrounded back vowel), instead of -yor (which has a rounded back vowel) when the subject is the third person plural onlar, it becomes -dı (which has an unrounded back vowel).
 If a verb ends in t, it may change into d (especially gitmek and etmek).
 If a verb ends in open vowels (a or e), the open vowels become closed while adding -yor (because of the closed auxiliary vowel -i-).
 a becomes ı if the preceding vowel is unrounded, u if it is rounded (ağla -> ağlıyor, topla -> topluyor)
 e becomes i if the preceding vowel is unrounded, ü if it is rounded (bekle -> bekliyor, söyle -> söylüyor)
 If the verb ends in a consonant, the auxiliary vowel -i- must be added before -yor. It becomes -ı-, -u- or -ü- depending on the frontness and roundedness of the preceding vowel, because of the vowel harmony:
 -i if the preceding vowel is e or i (front unrounded): gel -> geliyor
 -ı if the preceding vowel is a or ı (back unrounded): bak -> bakıyor
 -u if the preceding vowel is o or u (back rounded): kork -> korkuyor
 -ü if the preceding vowel is ö or ü (front rounded): gör -> görüyor
 r of -yor may be dropped in colloquial speech.

To form the negative of the past continuous tense, the negation suffix "-ma/-me", which becomes -mi, -mı, -mu, or -mü because of the closed auxiliary vowel and the vowel harmony, must be added before -yor.

Examples:

 The epenthetic consonant y is inserted between -mu and -du.
 As -mu and -du (which have a rounded back vowel) succeeds -lar (which has an unrounded back vowel) instead of -yor (which has a rounded back vowel) when the subject is the third person plural, onlar, they become -mı and -dı (which have an unrounded back vowel).

Semitic languages  
Semitic languages, especially the ancient forms, do not make use of the imperfect (or perfect) tense with verbs.  Instead, they use the imperfective and perfective aspects, respectively.  Aspects are similar to tenses, but differ by requiring contextual comprehension to know whether the verb indicates a completed or non-completed action.

Dravidian languages

Malayalam
In Malayalam (verbs are never conjugated for grammatical person, which is indicated by a pronoun), there are two indicative imperfects, corresponding exactly with English:
1 -ഉകയായിരുന്നു (ukayāyirunnu) endings (... was...), for example:
ഓടുകയായിരുന്നു (ōṭukayāyirunnu) ... was running

2 -ഉമായിരുന്നു (umāyirunnu) endings (... used to ...), for example:
ഓടുമായിരുന്നു (ōṭumāyirunnu) ... used to run

To form the "was doing" imperfect, take the infinitive ending in ഉക (uka), for example ഓടുക (ōṭuka) – to run – and add the ending – യായിരുന്നു (yāyirunnu).

To form the "used to do" imperfect, take off the ക (ka) from the end of the "uka" form and add മായിരുന്നു (māyirunnu) in its stead.

To make a verb in the imperfect negative, add അല്ല് (all) after the ഉകയ (ukaya) part of the ending for the "was doing" imperfect. For example, ഓടുകയല്ലായിരുന്നു (ōṭukayallāyirunnu) (...was not running). To do the same for the "used to do" imperfect, take off the ഉമ (uma) from the ending and add അത്തില്ല (attilla) instead. For example, ഓടത്തില്ലായിരുന്നു (ōṭattillāyirunnu) (...didn't use to run)

References

Grammatical tenses